Golf at the 2007 Southeast Asian Games took place in the Bananza Golf and Country Club, Bonanza Ranch Khaoyai, Nakhon Ratchasima Province, Thailand.

Medal tally

Medalists

External links
Southeast Asian Games Official Results
 

2007
2007 Southeast Asian Games
Southeast Asian Games
2007 Southeast Asian Games events